Hypersonic speeds are highly supersonic.

Hypersonic may also refer to:

Speed
 Hypersonic flight
 Hypersonic wind tunnel

Sound
 Hypersonic sound, a method for creating audible sound from ultrasound
 Hypersonic effect, a psychological effect induced by ultrasound
 HyperSonic Sound, a trade name for a device that produces modulated ultrasound that can make its carried signal audible without needing a receiver set

Other uses
 Hypersonic Broadcasting Center, Philippine radio network
 Hypersonic weapon, missiles and projectiles which travel at between 5 and 25 times the speed of sound
 Hypersonic XLC, a roller coaster in Virginia, U.S.
 HSQLDB, previously known as the Hypersonic SQL Project, a relational database management system
 Hyper Sonic, a super transformation in the video game Sonic 3 & Knuckles
 Hyper Sonic (film), a 2002 direct-to-video film starring Antonio Sabàto, Jr. and Adam Baldwin
 Hypersonic, a VST instrument by Steinberg